"Tomorrow" is a song by Canadian pop rock band Lillix, released by Maverick Records in October 2003 as the final single from the band's first studio album, Falling Uphill (2003). The song was written by three members of the band and Linda Perry, who also produced the track. It reached number 48 on the US Radio & Records CHR/Pop Top 50 chart.

Alternate versions
The ending of the song on the Confessions of a Teenage Drama Queen soundtrack was different from the one on the Falling Uphill album.

Track listing
US promo CD
 "Tomorrow" (Linda Perry top 40 remix) – 3:40

Charts

References

Lillix songs
2003 singles
2003 songs
Maverick Records singles
Songs written by Linda Perry